White Palace may refer to:
 White Palace (film), a 1990 film starring Susan Sarandon and James Spader
 White Palace (Ankara), former name of official residence of the President of Turkey in Ankara, Turkey
White Palace (Marghazar), palace in Swat, Khyber Pakhtunkhwa, Pakistan
 White Palace (Lhasa), former name of Potala Palace in Lhasa, Tibet, de jure official residence of the Dalai Lama 
 Beli Dvor, former residence of the Yugoslavian royal family in Belgrade, Serbia
 Palazzo Bianco, an art gallery in Genoa, Italy
 White Palace (Ctesiphon)